A zadruga refers to a type of rural community historically common among South Slavs. 

The term has been used by the Communist Party of Yugoslavia to designate their attempt at collective farming after World War II.

History
Originally, generally formed of one extended family or a clan of related families, the zadruga held its property, herds and money in common, with usually the oldest (patriarch) member ruling and making decisions for the family, though at times he would delegate this right at an old age to one of his sons.

Because the zadruga was based on a patrilocal system, when a girl married, she left her parents' zadruga and joined that of her husband. Within the zadruga, all of the family members worked to ensure that the needs of every other member were met.

The zadruga eventually went into decline beginning in the late 19th century, as the largest started to become unmanageable and broke into smaller zadrugas or formed villages. However, the zadruga system continues to color life in the Balkans; the typically intense concern for family found among South Slavs even today is partly due to centuries of living in the zadruga system.  Many modern-day villages in the Balkans have their roots in a zadruga, a large number of them carrying the name of the one that founded them.

This type of traditional, village style cooperation is similar to a late 19th-century Russian system called .

Today, in Croatia "zadruga" is regulated by the Law (Official Gazette, nr. 34/2011, 125/2013, 76/2014, 114/2018 and 98/2019). 

It has been debated whether the zadruga was actually as common historically as once assumed. Recent works have pointed out that the word zadruga itself originated only in 1818 and the scarcity of evidence for historical zadrugas.

See also 
Cooperative
Obshchina

References

Sources

External links 
Zadrugas in Bulgarian society

South Slavic culture
Serbian culture
Croatian culture
Bulgarian culture
Patriarchy